Thomas Clare was an English medieval Benedictine monk and university Chancellor.

Clare was a Doctor of Theology. He was a Benedictine monk in Bury St Edmunds. In 1409, he was a proctor for the English Benedictines in Pisa.

Clare was twice Chancellor of the University of Oxford in 1416 and 1417.

References

 

Year of birth unknown
Year of death unknown
English Christian monks
English Benedictines
Chancellors of the University of Oxford
14th-century English people
15th-century English people
15th-century Roman Catholics
14th-century Christian monks
15th-century Christian monks